The L&YR Class 26 was a class of 20  passenger steam locomotives of the Lancashire and Yorkshire Railway designed by Henry Hoy and introduced in 1903.  Most passed to the London, Midland and Scottish Railway (LMS) at the grouping in 1923 though they were withdrawn soon afterwards with none remaining in service after 1926.

Design and construction
Hoy intended the class to work Manchester, Rochdale, Oldham and Bury services where heavier trains and on lines gradients were giving difficulties to the Aspinall 2-4-2T radial tank locomotives.  To a degree they were an evolutionary design based on the enlarged version of the 2-4-2T radial tanks with six-coupled wheels and the belpaire firebox used on the Aspinall Atlantic High Flyers and Coal engine 0-8-0 types.

Service
On their introduction in 1903 they were allocated to Liverpool to Southport workings covering a temporary shortage of electric stock; they were subsequently placed on their intended routes where they had an initially successful introduction.  Problems with the class shortly emerged.  Their heavy weight was not good for the track and the long rigid wheelbase put pressure on rails with severe curves in sidings.  The flanges were removed from the centre driving wheels which eased some issues but increased the risk of derailment on track which was slightly out of alignment and particularly notably at junctions, flangeless driving wheels working better on smaller wheels placed closer together.  The side tanks had a propensity to severely leak and they gained a reputation for poor stopping ability.

Where George Hughes produced a superheated upgrade to the 2-4-2T radial tank they were able to perform the services allocated to the 2-6-2Ts and the latter were removed from passenger services in 1913 and placed on banking and shunting duties with water pickup equipment and coal rail removed for increased visibility for these duties.  They were not best suited to these duties due to large  driving wheels and having the flanges on the centre wheels removed.

Numbering

Withdrawal
One was withdrawn with unrepairable cracked frames in 1920.  A total of thee, Nos 202, 404 and 125 were withdrawn before being allocated a LMS number in 1923.  In the event only two (11704 and 11711) actually carried their allocated LMS number and all members of the class were withdrawn by 1926.  All had been scrapped by 1928 and none have been preserved.

References

Sources

2-6-2T locomotives
26
Railway locomotives introduced in 1903